Boken may refer to:

Boken, Pakistan, a town in Punjab
Bokken, a Japanese sword